Transitions is the third EP by Canadian rock band Silverstein. It is the band's first release with Hopeless since they left their longtime label, Victory Records. Transitions was released digitally through online media outlets on December 7, 2010. It's also the band's first EP since When the Shadows Beam in 2002, prior to signing with Victory.

Writing and recording 
Transitions is the band's first release with their new label, Hopeless. Vocalist Shane Told has always been a long-time fan of the label and the albums they release. Prior to the announcement of the EP, Told had stated in interviews that the band had already written 16 songs for a new album, much more than the average Silverstein album.  The Transitions EP has two songs that will appear on the band's 2011 full-length album, as well as three B-sides.

Transitions was mixed by Cameron Webb.

Release and reception 

On November 30, 2010, the EP was made available for pre-order on the iTunes Store.  The opening track "Sacrifice" was posted online on December 3. Transitions was released digitally on December 7. According to lead singer Shane Told, the songs "Sacrifice" and "Darling Harbour" will appear on the band's fifth full-length album, and a non-acoustic version of "Replace You" might make the album.  After the success of the EP, physical copies were sold.

Track listing 
 "Sacrifice" (music and lyrics: Shane Told) – 2:35
 "Darling Harbour" (music: Josh Bradford; lyrics: Told) – 2:52
 "Dancing on My Grave" (music: Neil Boshart; lyrics: Told) – 3:16
 "Replace You" (acoustic) (music and lyrics: Told) – 3:42
 "Wish" (Nine Inch Nails cover) – 3:31

Personnel 
Personnel per digital booklet.

Silverstein
 Shane Told – lead vocals
 Paul Koehler – drums
 Josh Bradford – rhythm guitar
 Neil Boshart – lead guitar
 Billy Hamilton – bass

Additional musician
 Anna Jarvis – cello

Production
 Jordan Valeriote – producer, engineer
 Cameron Webb – mixing (at Maple Sound, Santa Ana, California)
 Chuck Carvalho – mastering
 Inaam Haq – assistant engineer at Cherry Beach
 Shaun Gowman – drum tech
 Sons of Nero – art direction, layout

Chart positions

References 
 Footnotes

 Citations

External links 

 Transitions at YouTube (streamed copy where licensed)

Silverstein (band) EPs
2010 EPs
Hopeless Records EPs
Albums with cover art by Sons of Nero